Viorel Cosma (30 March 1923 – 15 August 2017) was a Romanian musician and teacher who came to wider prominence as an exceptionally prolific musicologist and a pioneering lexicographer.   Through his scholarship he also achieved distinction as a teacher, researcher and music critic.   Between 1989 and 2012 he produced a ten volume lexikon, running to 2,800 pages, entitled "Muzicieni din România", providing extensive information on approximately 1,500 Romanian composers and musicians, musicologists, music critics, music teachers, folklorists and other contributors to Romanian music and musicianship.

Biography 
Viorel Cosma was born at Timișoara,  the multi-ethnic economic and administrative capital of Banat, in the western part of the recently expanded Kingdom of Romania.   In 1929, despite being just 6, he was accepted as a pupil at the Timișoara Municipal Music Conservatory, where for the next two years he learned to play the violin.    He was taught by the violinist Eugen Cuteanu, while Sabin Drăgoi took care of the necessary Solfège and other aspects of music theory knowledge.

Cosma was 18 in 1940/41 when Romania became entangled in the war.   He fought for his country in a guards regiment and was seriously wounded twice.   His status as a war veteran would remain unpublicised and unknown for more than half a century, but during the final decade of his life, official and public attitudes towards Romania's role in the war grew more nuanced.  He became a regular participant at events arranged by the Ministry of Defence to honour surviving war heroes, even taking part in television shows involving war veterans.   In 2015, two years before he died, he was promoted to the rank of General (retired).

Back in 1945, after the war ended he  progressed his music education between 1945 and 1950 at the National University of Music in Bucharest.   Here he was taught by a number of Romania's leading composer-performers and musicologists, including Mihail Jora, Leon Klepper, Marțian Negrea, Constantin Silvestri, George Georgescu, Ion Dumitrescu, Dimitrie Cuclin and Zeno Vancea.

Between 1945 and 1947 he taught at the "Alberto della Pergola" conservatory in Bucharest.  Later, still in Bucharest, he taught at the "Dinu Lipatti" and "George Enescu" musical secondary schools.   At the university level he also taught, between 1951 and 1966, at the National University of Music and the  Hyperion University.   Meanwhile, he had already embarked on an intensive parallel career as a critic.   Several sources state that in the Romanian and foreign press, in the end, he published over 5,000 essays, studies, articles, reviews and other pieces of music criticism.   He delivered academic papers and contributed fully in various other ways at many of the symposia and conferences devoted to musicology, both in Europe and in the United States, at which he participated.

Viorel Cosma was also one of three co-librettists  for Gherase Dendrino's 1954 operetta "Lăsați-mă să cânt!" ("Let me sing!").   The piece enjoyed official backing.   Translated into Russian and several of the principal languages of middle Europe, it was staged in Romania, Germany, the Soviet Union, Austria, Bulgaria, Belgium and the Netherlands.   More than half a century later many of Dendrino's are overlooked, but the central themes of "Lăsați-mă să cânt!" are relatively timeless:  it was revived most recently at in 2018, at Cluj-Napoca.

As a musicologist Viorel Cosma published over 100 volumes, many of which appeared not just in Romanian, but in German, Russian, English, Bulgarian and Japanese.   His works were a combination of monographic, historiographic, lexicographic and epistolatory. There were works of music criticism, comparative musicology, study guides and anthologies.  Of particular note, he produced no fewer than 14 books devoted to Romania's best known composer-polymath, George Enescu (in Romanian, English, Russian, Japanese and Bulgarian).   Possibly more regularly consulted than some of these are his lexicons, "Compozitori și muzicologi români" ("Romanian composers and Musicologists",1965) and "Muzicieni români" ("Romanian Musicians", 1970).   More formidable still was "Muzicieni din România", the ten volume lexikon, produced by Cosma between 1989 and 2012.   This compilation, and "Interpreți din România" ("Romanian Performers"), which he published in 1996, won for Viorel Cosma international recognition.   At the time of his death he was engaged in producing a monumental fifteen volume "Enciclopedia muzicii din România" of which the first two volumes ("A" and "B") had already been completed and appeared in book shops.

Viorel Cosma was a member of various professional associations and foundations, both inside Romania and beyond its borders.  He was a member of the Georg Friedrich Händel Society in Halle, of the Basel-based International Musicological Society, the Music Research Association in Kassel, the Société française de musicologie in Paris and the Société Fryderyk Chopin in Warsaw.

Evaluation 
According to admirers, Viorel Cosma laid the groundwork of modern musical lexicography in Romania, creating the most extensive national lexicographic music exegesis anywhere in the world.   His musicological research spans five centuries, between 1500 and 2000, discovering or rediscovering the names of hundreds of Romanian artists who made musical careers in Romania and/or abroad.   As a Professor of Musicology, during the twentieth century he created and trained the first generation of Romanian musicologists and music critics, occupying for many years the first high-profile professorial chair at the National University of Music (as it became known) in Bucharest, following its reconfiguration, rebranding and relaunch.   Inspired by his involvement in the folk music revival, which emerged with particular force in Romania during the first half of the twentieth century, Cosma played a central role in rediscovering connections between Romanian tradition and the more widespread music cultures of and beyond the European continent:  he is credited with having identified more than 100 non-Romanian works inspired by Romanian folklore.

A particular specialism in respect of Cosma's own researches was the life and works of the composer George Enescu.   It was indeed in part a reflection of Enescu's own international profile that Cosma travelled abroad on various occasion to deliver lectures on the Romanian composer, notably in France and in the United States.  Venues included the Académie des Beaux-Arts and the Sorbonne in Paris, along with Boston University in Massachusetts.   He also shared his specialisms in some of the western world's leading music lexicons and encyclopædias, contributing to "Grove's Dictionary", "Die Musik in Geschichte und Gegenwart", the "Dictionnaire des interprètes et de l'interprétation musicale au XXe " of Alain Pâris, "Sohlmans musiklexikon" and other major publications with similar aspirations.

Celebration and recognition (selection) 
  Viorel Cosma was a recipient of the "Premiile Academiei Române" (award) in 1974
  He received the "Artisjus [international music critics' Award] Prize" in 1984.
  In 1998 Viorel Cosma accepted a Doctorate in Musicology from the Bucharest Universitatea Națională de Muzică.
  He holds a "Doctor Honoris Causa" from the Arts Institute of Chișinău, in Moldova.
  Viorel Cosma received awards from the "Uniunea Compozitorilor și Muzicologilor din România" ("Union of Composers and Musicologists") no fewer than ten times.

  Viorel Cosma's state honours included the Order of the Crown, the Order of the Star of Romania and the Order of Artistic Merit (Grand Officer).

  Viorel Cosma became a corresponding member of the Rome-based "Pontifical Tiberina Academy" in January 2004.
  Viorel Cosma was created a "Cetățean de onoare" (honoured citizen) of his birth city, Timișoara.

Output (selection)

References 

National University of Music Bucharest alumni
Romanian musicologists
Romanian music critics
Recipients of the Order of the Crown (Romania)
Recipients of the Order of the Star of Romania
Recipients of the Order of Cultural Merit (Romania)
Musicians from Timișoara
Writers from Timișoara
1923 births
2017 deaths